Henri Lecoq (18 April 1802 – 4 August 1871) was a French botanist. Charles Darwin mentioned this name in 1859 in the preface of his famous book On The Origin of Species as a believer in the modification of species. Darwin wrote:

The work referenced by Darwin is Lecoq's "Étude de la Géographie Botanique de l’Europe", published in 1854.

A number of plants carry the name of Lecoq in their descriptive names (see IPNI search). Also in 1829, botanist DC. published Lecokia, a monotypic genus of flowering plants belonging to the family Apiaceae with its name honouring him.

In addition a museum in his home town of Clermont Ferrand (France) is named after him.

References

1871 deaths
1802 births
19th-century French botanists
Proto-evolutionary biologists